Louise Duffield Cummings (21 November 1870 – 9 May 1947) was a Canadian-born American mathematician. She was born in Hamilton, Ontario.

Education and career
As a young child, Louise Duffield Cummings studied at the public schools and Collegiate Institute at Hamilton.

Cummings received her B.A. in 1895 from the University of Toronto. She studied mathematics at the graduate level in 1895–1896 under the Professor DeLury at University of Toronto, in 1896–1897 at the University of Pennsylvania where she held a fellowship, in 1897–1898 at the University of Chicago, and in 1898–1900 at Bryn Mawr College. During 1900–1901 she taught at the Ontario Normal College and, while completing her A.M. at the University of Toronto, she taught at St. Margaret's College during 1901–1902. she worked with Henry White and Charlotte Scott was her supervisor. She returned to Bryn Mawr College in 1905 and 1912–1913.

Cummings joined the faculty of Vassar in 1902 as an instructor; she worked with Henry White and Charlotte Scott was her supervisor. She finally received her Ph.D. from Bryn Mawr in 1914 with a thesis "On a Method of Comparison for Triple-Systems," published in the Transactions of the American Mathematical Society, Vol 15 (July 1914) . Her major subject was Pure Mathematics, and her minors were Applied Mathematics and Physics. before her retirement in 1936. She was promoted to assistant professor in 1915, to associate professor in 1919, and to full professor in 1927. She was an invited speaker at the International Congress of Mathematicians in 1924 at Toronto and again in 1932 at Zürich.

Selected publications

 (Ph.D. dissertation)
with H. S. White:

References

External links
 
 

1870 births
1947 deaths
American women mathematicians
19th-century American mathematicians
20th-century American mathematicians
Canadian mathematicians
University of Toronto alumni
Bryn Mawr College alumni
Vassar College faculty
People from Hamilton, Ontario
20th-century women mathematicians
20th-century American women
19th-century American women